Axel Östrand (15 May 1909 – 11 May 2005) was a Swedish ski jumper. He competed in the individual event at the 1936 Winter Olympics.

References

External links
 

1909 births
2005 deaths
Swedish male ski jumpers
Olympic ski jumpers of Sweden
Ski jumpers at the 1936 Winter Olympics
People from Örnsköldsvik Municipality
Sportspeople from Västernorrland County